The Battle of Matthew's Day was fought near Viljandi (probably in Vanamõisa) on 21 September 1217 during the Livonian Crusade. The adversaries were the Sword Brethren (a German Crusading order) with their recently converted Livonian and Latgalian allies versus an army of 6000 Estonian men from different counties, led by Lembitu, who had attempted to unify the Estonians. The Germans won, although the converted Livonian chieftain Caupo of Turaida died. Lembitu was also killed, and many other Estonians were forced to convert.

References

Battles of the Livonian Crusade
Battles involving Estonia
Battles involving Livs
Battles involving Letts
Battles involving the Livonian Brothers of the Sword
Battles in Estonia
1217 in Europe
Conflicts in 1217
Viljandi County